Gaillefontaine is a commune in the Seine-Maritime department in the Normandy region in northern France.

Geography

Population

Places of interest 

 The eleventh-century church of St.Jean-Baptiste at the hamlet of Noyers.
 The eleventh-century church of St.Maurice.
 The church of Notre-Dame, dating from the thirteenth century.
 Some 17th-century remains of the abbey.
 The remains of the 11th-century castle.
 The château at Saint-Maurice
 The château de Gaillefontaine, dating from the nineteenth century.
 Several old houses, dating from the sixteenth century.

See also
Communes of the Seine-Maritime department

References

External links

 Official commune website 

Communes of Seine-Maritime